Below is a list of notable footballers who have played for JS Saoura. Generally, this means players that have played 100 or more league matches for the club. However, some players who have played fewer matches are also included; this includes players that have had considerable success either at other clubs or at international level, as well as players who are well remembered by the supporters for particular reasons.

Players are listed in alphabetical order according to the date of their first-team official debut for the club. Appearances and goals are for first-team competitive matches only. Substitute appearances included. Statistics accurate as of 11 June 2022.

List of JS Saoura players

Nationalities are indicated by the corresponding FIFA country code.

List of All-time appearances
This List of All-time appearances for JS Saoura contains football players who have played for JS Saoura and have managed to accrue 100 or more appearances.

Bold Still playing competitive football in JS Saoura.

1 Includes the Super Cup and League Cup.
2 Includes the Confederation Cup and Champions League.
3 Includes the UAFA Club Cup.

List of leading goalscorers
Bold Still playing competitive football in JS Saoura.

1 Includes the Super Cup.
2 Includes the Confederation Cup and Champions League.
3 Includes the UAFA Club Cup.

Players to Europe

List of international footballers

Notes

References

Players
 
JS Saoura
JS Saoura
Association football player non-biographical articles